Camilus McBane House is a historic home located near Snow Camp, Alamance County, North Carolina. The house consists of two log buildings: a one-story, single-room log kitchen and a one-story with loft hall-and-parlor plan log house built about 1850. It was expanded in 1892 by a one-room frame side addition.

It was added to the National Register of Historic Places in 1993.

References

Log houses in the United States
Houses on the National Register of Historic Places in North Carolina
Houses completed in 1892
Houses in Alamance County, North Carolina
National Register of Historic Places in Alamance County, North Carolina
Log buildings and structures on the National Register of Historic Places in North Carolina